Explaining Hitler: The Search for the Origins of His Evil is a 1998 book by historian-journalist Ron Rosenbaum, in which the author discusses his struggles with the "exceptionalist" character of Adolf Hitler's personality and impact on the world or, worse (from Rosenbaum's point of view), his struggle with the possibility that Hitler is not an exception at all, but on the natural continuum of human destructive possibility.

See also
List of Adolf Hitler books
Münchener Post
Ron Rosenbaum Explaining Hitler Interview on C-Spanvideo.

References

1998 non-fiction books
Books about Adolf Hitler
Books about Nazism
English-language books